HD 151566 is double star in the southern constellation of Ara. As of 1991, the pair had an angular separation of 3.10″ along a position angle of 42°.

References

External links
 HR 6236
 CCDM J16506-5003
 Image HD 151566

Ara (constellation)
151566
Double stars
082418
A-type giants
6236
F-type giants
Durchmusterung objects